Ignelater luminosus, known as the cucubano, is a species of click beetle native to the island of Puerto Rico. Cucubanos are often confused with fireflies, which are in a different family (Lampyridae), as they can also emit light from the thorax. Their paired prothorax light organs and single light organ on the anterior surface of the abdomen gives the appearance of two "headlights" and one "backlight", which it can turn off independently.

Because light pollution interferes with their reproduction, they prefer rural areas without much development.

Locations known to be its habitat are the rural areas and outskirts of the city of Adjuntas, located in the mountains.

A Puerto Rican firefly is called a cucullo which is a true firefly, also native to Puerto Rico. Cucullos average half an inch in length. The color of both of these insects' lights is bright green.

The genome of Ignelater luminosus was sequenced in 2018.

References

Insects of Puerto Rico
Elateridae
Bioluminescent insects
Beetles described in 1807